ANSI is the American National Standards Institute, a private nonprofit organization that oversees the development of voluntary consensus standards.
	
ANSI may also refer to:

Computing
 ANSI character set (disambiguation)
 ANSI escape code sequences, an in-band signalling mechanism for terminals and terminal emulators
 ANSI, BASIC programming language standards

Places
 Ansi City, an ancient city of the Goguryeo in modern Anshan city, China
 Ansi, Estonia, village in Saaremaa Parish, Saare County, Estonia

People
 Al-Ansi, Arab tribe
 Aswad Ansi, Arab false prophet
 Ansi Agolli (born 1982), Albanian football player
 Ansi Molina
 Ansi Nika (born 1990), Albanian football player
 Nasser bin Ali al-Ansi (1975–2015), Al-Qaeda leader

Other uses
 Area of Natural and Scientific Interest, used by the Government of Ontario, Canada to classify land zones